The 1975–76 Toronto Maple Leafs season saw the Maple Leafs finish in third place in the Adams Division with a record of 34 wins, 31 losses, and 15 ties for 83 points. They defeated the Pittsburgh Penguins two games to one in the Preliminary Round before losing the Quarter-Finals in seven games to the Philadelphia Flyers.

Offseason

NHL Draft

Regular season

Sittler's Ten Point Night
 February 7, 1976 – In his first season as captain Darryl Sittler set the NHL record for most points scored in one game when he recorded ten points (six goals, four assists) against the Boston Bruins. At the 9:27 mark of the third period, he scored a goal and earned the ninth point of the game, breaking the NHL record for most points in a game. He would go on to earn another point to set a new record with 10 points in a game. Almost 40 years later, this record still stands. Sittler finished the season with 41 goals and 59 assists, being the first Leaf ever to reach the 100-point mark.

Season standings

Schedule and results

Player statistics

Regular season
Scoring

Goaltending

Playoffs
Scoring

Goaltending

Transactions
The Maple Leafs have been involved in the following transactions during the 1975-76 season.

Trades

Free agents

Playoffs
 Darryl Sittler tied the playoff record for most goals in one game, with five against Philadelphia.

Awards and records
 Borje Salming, defence, NHL 2nd All-Star Team
 Darryl Sittler, Molson Cup (most game star selections for Toronto Maple Leafs)
 Wayne Thomas, appeared in NHL All-Star Game

References
 Maple Leafs on Hockey Database

Toronto Maple Leafs seasons
Toronto Maple Leafs season, 1975-76
Tor